Xerox Success is the third full-length album, released by thrash metal band Equinox. It was released in 1992.

Track listing

1992 albums
Equinox (thrash metal band) albums
Albums produced by Kevin Ridley